There are several places named Gull River:

 Gull River (Balsam Lake) in the Kawartha lakes area of Ontario, Canada empties into Balsam Lake on the Trent-Severn Waterway 
 Gull River (Lake Nipigon) in Thunder Bay District of Ontario flows east into Gull Bay on the western side of Lake Nipigon
Former name for the town of Minden, Ontario, in the township of Minden Hills, Ontario
Gull River (Cass County) in Cass County in the U.S. state of Minnesota
Gull River (Crow Wing River) in the U.S. state of Minnesota
Gull River (Turtle River) in the U.S. state of Minnesota
Gull River (Beltrami County) in Beltrami County in the U.S. state of Minnesota

See also 
 Gull (disambiguation)
 Gull Lake (disambiguation)
 Gull Island (disambiguation)
 Gull Glacier
 Sea Gull River in the U.S. state of Minnesota